Stratton Owen Hammon (March 6, 1904 – October 22, 1997) was a Louisville, Kentucky, architect known for his Colonial Revival style homes.

Life
Hammon was a graduate of DuPont Manual High School in Louisville where he studied art and architectural drafting. He studied architecture briefly at the University of Louisville. He learned the architecture trade working with a Louisville builder named Murphy and opened his own architecture practice during the height of the Great Depression. He is known for the more than 100 distinctive homes he designed in Kentucky and for the house plans that he published in magazines such as Good Housekeeping, Better Homes and Gardens and McCall's throughout the United States. It is impossible to know how many homes were built based on these plans in various parts of the United States.

He became the 30th Kentucky registered architect in 1930 and was later president of the Kentucky Chapter of the American Institute of Architects.

During World War II, Hammon served as captain in the United States Army Corps of Engineers, supervising construction projects such as Columbus Air Support Base, soon to be called Bakalar Air Force Base, in Columbus, Indiana. He participated in the Normandy Invasion in June 1944 and also served as one of the Monuments Men at the close of the war. He rose to the rank of lieutenant colonel by the end of the war. The French government awarded him both the Croix de Guerre and the Legion of Honor for his efforts in France during World War II

The Speed Museum in Louisville mounted an exhibition of Hammon's work in 2007 and a book was published that same year containing photographs of many Hammon homes and a definitive record of his Kentucky commissions. Architectural historian Richard Guy Wilson has lectured on Hammon's work at the Filson Historical Society.

He is buried at Cave Hill Cemetery in Louisville.

External links
 Kentucky Educational Television story on Hammon
 Indiana Historical Marker noting Hammon contribution to construction of Atterbury Army Air Field

References

1904 births
1997 deaths
Architects from Louisville, Kentucky
DuPont Manual High School alumni
Burials at Cave Hill Cemetery
Recipients of the Legion of Honour
Recipients of the Croix de Guerre 1939–1945 (France)
Monuments men
20th-century American architects